Charles Dacre Parsons (born April 13, 1933) is an American philosopher best known for his work in the philosophy of mathematics and the study of the philosophy of Immanuel Kant.  He is professor emeritus at Harvard University.

Life and career 
Parsons is a son of the famous Harvard sociologist Talcott Parsons.  He earned his Ph.D. in philosophy at Harvard University in 1961, under the direction of Burton Dreben and Willard Van Orman Quine.  He taught for many years at Columbia University before moving to Harvard University in 1989.  He retired in 2005 as the Edgar Pierce professor of philosophy, a position formerly held by Quine.

He is an elected Fellow of the American Academy of Arts and Sciences and the Norwegian Academy of Science and Letters.

Among his former doctoral students are Michael Levin, James Higginbotham, Peter Ludlow, Gila Sher, Øystein Linnebo, Richard Tieszen, and Mark van Atten.

In 2017, Parsons held the Gödel Lecture titled Gödel and the universe of sets.

Philosophical work 
In addition to his work in logic and the philosophy of mathematics, Parsons was an editor, with Solomon Feferman and others, of the posthumous works of Kurt Gödel.  He has also written on historical figures, especially Immanuel Kant, Gottlob Frege, Kurt Gödel, and Willard Van Orman Quine.

Works

Books
 1983. Mathematics in Philosophy: Selected Essays.  Ithaca, N.Y.:  Cornell Univ. Press.
 2008. Mathematical Thought and its Objects.  Cambridge Univ. Press.
 2012. From Kant to Husserl: Selected Essays.  Cambridge, Massachusetts, and London:  Harvard Univ. Press.
 2014a. Philosophy of Mathematics in the Twentieth Century:  Selected Essays.  Cambridge, Massachusetts, and London:  Harvard Univ. Press.

Selected articles
 1987. "Developing Arithmetic in Set Theory without infinity: Some Historical Remarks". History and Philosophy of Logic, vol. 8, pp. 201–213.
 1990a. "The Uniqueness of the Natural Numbers". Iyyun, vol. 39, pp. 13–44. ISSN 0021-3306.
 1990b. "The Structuralist View of Mathematical Objects". Synthese, vol. 84 (3), pp. 303–346.
 2014b. "Analyticity for Realists". In Interpreting Gödel: Critical Essays, ed. J. Kennedy. Cambridge University Press, pp. 131–150.

References

1933 births
American logicians
Harvard Graduate School of Arts and Sciences alumni
Columbia University faculty
Harvard University faculty
Living people
Mathematical logicians
Philosophers of mathematics
Members of the Norwegian Academy of Science and Letters
Gödel Lecturers